Midnight Special is a 2016 American science fiction film written and directed by Jeff Nichols, and produced by Sarah Green and Brian Kavanaugh-Jones. The film stars Michael Shannon, Joel Edgerton, Kirsten Dunst, Adam Driver, Jaeden Martell, and Sam Shepard.  It is Nichols's fourth full-length film and his first studio production. It was selected to compete for the Golden Bear at the 66th Berlin International Film Festival.

Shannon plays a father who escapes with his son from both the government and a cult after they discover that his son has special powers. The film began a theatrical release on March 18 by Warner Bros. Pictures, expanding wider in subsequent weeks.

Plot

In a motel, Roy Tomlin and his friend Lucas watch an AMBER Alert for 8-year-old Alton Meyer and his reported abductor, Roy, while the boy reads on the floor.

At the Ranch, a religious cult in rural Texas, Pastor Calvin Meyer dispatches two of his parishioners to retrieve Alton. He then faces his congregation as the FBI storms their church. NSA communications analyst Paul Sevier asks Calvin how numbers sent via encoded satellite transmissions made their way into his sermons. Calvin explains that Alton speaks in tongues and gave the numbers to Calvin. As Alton's powers grew, his mother Sarah abandoned him, and members of the Ranch have been raising him, with Pastor Meyer as his adoptive father. It is also noted in this sequence that Roy is Alton's biological father. Roy is protective of Alton, doing everything in his power to avert danger.

After a violent confrontation with a state trooper, Roy and Lucas seek cover at the home of Elden, a former Ranch member. During the night, an earthquake seems to wake Roy and Lucas. When they break down the door to Alton's room, they find him linked to Elden by blinding beams of light directly from his eyes into Elden's. Roy knocks out Elden and covers up Alton, who is extremely photosensitive. They take Elden's van and continue on toward a location that Alton specified. Members of the Ranch seem to know this location, but the FBI is desperately trying to figure out where the trio are headed.

When they stop at a gas station, Alton seems to destroy a satellite, creating a rain of debris crashing down on them. They drive to Sarah Tomlin's house, and she is overjoyed to be reunited with her son. After they watch the news together, Alton explains that he caused the satellite to crash because the police were using it to track him.

As the fugitives (now including Sarah) continue on their trek, Alton appears to be growing sick and weak. He convinces Roy to let him see the daylight, while Lucas and Sarah go ahead to a motel. After witnessing his first ever sunrise, Alton's eyes begin to glow, and an enormous dome of light surrounds the duo. They reunite with Lucas and Sarah, and Alton is healthy. He explains that seeing the sun helped him realize his true identity. He explains that there is a world "built on top of" this one, and that he belongs to it. Roy confirms that he briefly saw this hidden world inside the dome of light.

When they exit the hotel room, they are ambushed by Calvin's trackers from the ranch, who abduct Alton but are soon captured by the police. The boy is taken to a government facility where, although he had no normal way of knowing who the man was, he still insists that he will talk only to Paul Sevier. After Sevier experiences Alton's powers, he helps reunite him with his parents. Having deduced their destination from Calvin's sermons, Sevier warns the fugitives that there is a 5-mile security perimeter around the location, on the Florida panhandle.

Roy barrels through a roadblock, driving inside the perimeter as the Army scrambles to give chase. As they speed away, Alton lets them know just where to stop.  Alton and Sarah speedily exit the car and run into the woods. Roy and Lucas lead the Army on a wild goose chase while Alton and Sarah reach the edge of a swamp. There, a great dome of light appears, engulfing much of Florida and surrounding states.  Everyone inside the dome of light can see the futuristic structures of a parallel world. Eventually, other beings of this world gather around Alton, and the entire dome disappears, taking Alton with it.

Roy and Lucas are arrested. Lucas is interviewed by the FBI. He tells them the story, but they are dissatisfied. Sevier then enters to interview him, with Lucas the only one aware of Sevier's previous involvement. Sarah, apparently walking away from her past life forever, cuts off her cult-traditionalist hair braid in a local gas station. Roy is incarcerated, but can watch the sunrise, his eyes briefly and faintly glowing in a similar manner to Alton's.

Cast

 Michael Shannon as Roy Tomlin
 Joel Edgerton as Lucas
 Kirsten Dunst as Sarah Tomlin
 Adam Driver as Paul Sevier
 Jaeden Martell as Alton
 Sam Shepard as Pastor Calvin Meyer
 Bill Camp as Doak
 Scott Haze as Levi
 Paul Sparks as Agent Miller
 David Jensen as Elden

Production
Principal photography commenced on January 20, 2014, and took place for 40 days in New Orleans, wrapping on March 1, 2014. The film was produced by Sarah Green and Brian Kavanaugh-Jones, with Glen Basner and Christos V. Konstantakopoulos as executive producers.

Release 
Midnight Special was backed and primarily distributed by Warner Bros. Pictures, and Entertainment One handled UK distribution. Warner Bros. initially set the film for a release on November 25, 2015, but in July 2015 moved the date back to March 18, 2016. The film was given a limited release on March 18, 2016, while the wide expansion began on April 8 in the United States. Warner Home Video released the film on DVD and Blu-ray in the U.S. on June 14, 2016.

Reception
Rotten Tomatoes gives the film an 83% approval rating based on 240 reviews; the average score is 7.30/10. The site's consensus reads, "Midnight Specials intriguing mysteries may not resolve themselves to every viewer's liking, but the journey is ambitious, entertaining, and terrifically acted." On Metacritic, the film has a weighted average score of 76 out of 100 based on 44 critics, indicating "generally favorable reviews".

Ignatiy Vishnevetsky of The A.V. Club described the "Spielberg-esque" science fiction chase film as "more of a genre piece than anything Nichols has done, carried by its steady momentum and its engrossing sense of mystery." He praised Midnight Special for Nichols' visual style and an "embarrassment of wonderful performances". Benjamin Lee, writing for The Guardian, felt that Nichols was "making a concerted effort to stake his claim as a hit-maker" but that the film lacks "Spielbergian magic", leaving it "disappointingly lifeless".

References

External links
 

 
 Midnight Special on Sporify

2016 films
2010s coming-of-age drama films
2010s science fiction drama films
American coming-of-age drama films
American science fiction drama films
Dune Entertainment films
2010s English-language films
Films set in Florida
Films set in Louisiana
Films set in San Antonio
Films shot in New Orleans
Films about telekinesis
Warner Bros. films
Films directed by Jeff Nichols
2016 drama films
Films about father–son relationships
2010s American films